AMPK may refer to:

 AMP-activated protein kinase, an enzyme
 (acetyl-CoA carboxylase) kinase, an enzyme